These are the results of the 2005 IAAF World Athletics Final, which took place in at the Stade Louis II in Monte Carlo, Monaco on 9 to 10 September. The hammer throw events were staged separately on 3 September in Szombathely, Hungary, due to stadium limitations in Monaco.

The year's top seven athletes, based on their points ranking of the 2005 IAAF World Athletics Tour, qualified to compete in each event, with an extra four athletes selected for races of 1500 metres and above. One additional athlete, a wildcard, was allocated to each event by the IAAF and replacement athletes were admitted to replace the qualified athletes that could not attend the final.

Track
Key

100 metres

200 metres

400 metres

800 metres

1500 metres

3000 metres

5000 metres

110/100 metres hurdles

400 metres hurdles

3000 metres steeplechase

Field

High jump

Pole vault

Long jump

Triple jump

Shot put

Discus throw

Hammer throw

Javelin throw

References

Results
2005 IAAF World Athletics Final results. IAAF. Retrieved 2018-04-24.
3rd IAAF World Athletics Final. IAAF. Retrieved 2018-04-24.

World Athletics Final results
Events at the IAAF World Athletics Final